David Macpherson and Grant Stafford were the defending champions but only Macpherson competed that year with Andrew Florent.

Florent and Macpherson lost in the first round to Bob Bryan and Mike Bryan.

Wayne Black and Kevin Ullyett won in the final 7–5, 6–2 against the Bryans.

Seeds

  Wayne Black /  Kevin Ullyett (champions)
  Sjeng Schalken /  Todd Woodbridge (quarterfinals)
  Joshua Eagle /  Sandon Stolle (semifinals)
  David Prinosil /  Jeff Tarango (quarterfinals)

Draw

External links
 2002 AAPT Championships Doubles Draw

Next Generation Adelaide International
2002 ATP Tour
2002 in Australian tennis